Clifford Jocelyn Offer (b 10 August 1943) was Archdeacon of Norwich from 1994 to 2008.

Offer was educated at The King's School, Canterbury, Exeter University and Westcott House, Cambridge. After a curacy at St Peter and St Paul, Bromley he was Team Vicar for  Southampton City Centre from 1974 to 1983; He was Team Rector of Hitchin from 1983 to 1994.

References

1943 births
Living people
20th-century English Anglican priests
21st-century English Anglican priests
People educated at The King's School, Canterbury
Archdeacons of Norwich
Alumni of the University of Exeter
Alumni of Westcott House, Cambridge